Ruslan Adilkhanovich Dibirghadzhiyev (born 20 July 1988, Dagestan) is an Avar Russian naturalized Azerbaijani freestyle wrestler. He competed at the 70 kg division in the 2014 European Wrestling Championships and won the gold medal after beating Grigor Grigoryan of Armenia.

References

External links
 

Living people
1988 births
Wrestlers at the 2015 European Games
European Games medalists in wrestling
European Games bronze medalists for Azerbaijan
Azerbaijani male sport wrestlers
European Wrestling Championships medalists
21st-century Azerbaijani people